Jours étranges is a Damien Saez album, released on October 25, 1999.

Track listing
 Jeune et con (“Young and stupid”) - 3:52
 Sauver cette étoile (“Save that star”) - 5:02
 Jours étranges (“Strange days”) - 5:19
 J'veux m'en aller (“I wanna go away”) - 6:24
 Hallelujah - 4:09
 Crépuscule (“Twilight”) - 5:09
 Soleil 2000 (“Sun 2000”) - 5:12
 Amandine II - 3:31
 Rock'n'Roll Star - 3:53
 My Funny Valentine - 4:21
 Montée là-haut (“[She] Went up there”) - 6:06
 Petit Prince (“Little Prince”) - 3:04

Damien Saez albums
1999 debut albums